Mahbub Jamil is a Bangladeshi businessman and former special assistant to the Chief Advisor of the Caretaker government with the rank of a cabinet minister.

Career
On 22 January 2008, Jamil was appointed Special Assistant to Chief Advisor of the Caretaker government, Fakhruddin Ahmed, with the rank of a Minister. He was placed in charge of the Ministry of Civil Aviation and Tourism, Ministry of Industry, and Ministry of Sports and Youth Affairs.

Jamil is the Chairman of Singer Bangladesh. He had served as the President of Metropolitan Chamber of Commerce and Industry, Dhaka and Foreign Investors Chamber of Commerce and Industry.

On 25 February 2008, Jamil was appointed Chairperson of the Board of Directors of Bangladesh Biman.

On 28 July 2011, Jamil was appointed an adviser to the Board of Directors of Robi Axiata.

See also 

 Manik Lal Samaddar-Special Assistant/Advisor

References

Advisors of Caretaker Government of Bangladesh
Living people
Year of birth missing (living people)
Civil Aviation and Tourism ministers of Bangladesh
Industries ministers of Bangladesh
Youth and Sports ministers of Bangladesh